Real Kashmir FC is an Indian professional football club based in Srinagar, Jammu and Kashmir. Incorporated in 2016, the club competes in both the I-League, and J&K Premier Football League.

Nicknamed "Sheeni Seh", Real Kashmir is the first ever club from Jammu and Kashmir to earn promotion to compete in any top flight football league of the country. Club's futsal section has been competing in the state league, as well as AIFF Futsal Club Championship, the highest division of futsal club competition in the country.

History

Formation as a club
The seeds of Real Kashmir FC were sown in 2014 after devastating floods swept through the region causing massive loss of life and property. To keep the youth, who had lost much during the floods—engaged, Shamim Mehraj, editor of a local newspaper named "Kashmir Monitor", and Sandeep Chattoo, a local businessman, came together to arrange footballers.

What began as a community outreach programme garnered massive support from the local populace and it soon started evolving into something more. Real Kashmir FC as a club, formalised in 2016, and affiliated with Jammu & Kashmir Football Association (JKFA) under the tireless efforts by Chattoo, currently the owner of the club. Founded in 2016, Real Kashmir FC emerged as the first ever top flight professional football club in Jammu and Kashmir.

Participation in tournaments

Shortly after its formation, the club participated in their first national competition in September 2016 when they competed in the 2016 Durand Cup. In January 2017, Real Kashmir roped in David Robertson as their new head coach, and in July, it became the first club from Jammu & Kashmir to play on foreign soil by playing 4 matches in Scotland. They appeared in their first major tournament by competing in the 2016–17 I-League 2nd Division, but failed to reach to the final round. They have been participating in all four categories of the AIFF.

In May 2018, Real Kashmir FC earned promotion to the 2018–19 I-League by winning the 2017–18 I-League 2nd Division after defeating Hindustan FC in the final game of the season by a score of 3–2.

On 30 May 2018, Real Kashmir became champions of the I-League 2nd Division. This was only their second season at this level, after the club's inception in 2016, earning promotion to the I-League for the first time ahead of the 2018–19 season. In 11 December 2018, they witnessed one of the league's biggest wins, after they thrashed Shillong Lajong FC by 6–1. Real Kashmir achieved third place in their debut season.

In August 2018, the Real Kashmir FC youth team travelled to Germany for pre-season training with one of the best football clubs in the world: Borussia Dortmund (BVB). The youth team visited the training centers where official BVB teams train. They also visited the famous BVB stadium Westfalenstadion. They participated in 2019 Durand Cup and reached the semi-finals, but lost 3–1 to Mohun Bagan.

On 19 December 2020, the Snow Leopards, as they are fondly called, added another golden chapter in their short yet eventful history by winning the 123rd edition of the IFA Shield tournament, defeating George Telegraph at the Salt Lake Stadium in Kolkata. It is the first major domestic triumph since their inception in 2016.

For I-League 2021, they borrowed three players (Danish Farooq Bhat, Adnan Ayoub, Farhan Ganie) from J&K Bank Football Club. In the 2020–21 I-League, the club finished their campaign in fifth place (Play-off), accumulating 21 points with 5 wins in 15 matches.

As the defending champions of IFA Shield, Real Kashmir began its 2021 edition campaign on 24 November with a 3–0 win over Indian Arrows. They retained their title with a 2–1 win against Sreenidi Deccan on 15 December. The club failed to make an impact in the 2021–22 I-League season and finished on twelfth place. In midway of the 2022–23 season, the club roped in English manager Gifton Noel-Williams as new head coach, who succeeded Mehrajuddin Wadoo in February 2023.

Kit manufacturers and shirt sponsors

Stadium

The club is currently using 11,000 seater TRC Polo Synthetic Turf Ground in Srinagar, as their home ground until the renovation of Bakshi Stadium. Since 2015, the ground is being used in I-League 2nd Division as the home ground for their rival Lonestar Kashmir, and I-League for Real Kashmir. The ground is operated by the Jammu & Kashmir Football Association and renovated in 2015. It has artificial turf.

Rivalry
Real Kashmir has a rivalry with their fellow Jammu & Kashmir-based club Lonestar Kashmir FC, that participated in the I-League 2nd Division. The team has also participated in the inaugural 2020–21 Real Kashmir Cup, which was hosted at the TRC Turf Ground.

Players

First-team squad

Current technical staff

Records and statistics

Overall records

Season by season

Managerial record

Notable players

The following Real Kashmir players have been capped at full international level. Years in brackets indicate their spells at the club.

  Aaron Katebe (2018–2020)
 Kashif Siddiqi (2019)
 Tenzin Samdup (2019–2020)
  Zohib Islam Amiri (2021)
  Masih Saighani (2021)
  Nozim Babadjanov (2022–2023)
  Nuriddin Davronov (2023–)

Partnership & reception

On 22 October 2018, Adidas India announced its official partnership with Real Kashmir Football Club, the first football team from the Kashmir valley to qualify for the country's top tier I-League.

Beginning with the 2018–19 I-league season, Adidas became the official kit partner for the club. Also, beyond kit sponsorship, Adidas India aims at redefining the 'Real' Kashmir through the lens of sports and becoming a proponent of changing lives in Kashmir through football.

Worldwide attention
Real Kashmir have received international acclaim following their participation in a BBC Scotland documentary named "Real Kashmir FC" that followed the team and their Scottish manager David Robertson, which won the best 'Single Documentary' category at the British Academy Film and Television Arts (BAFTA) or BAFTA Film Awards Scotland. It additionally won at the UK "Broadcast Awards" for best documentary, and the best documentary and best director for Greg Clark at the Rotterdam European Sports Awards. A follow up documentary "Return to Real Kashmir FC" was then made and given a 4 star review in The Guardian. The documentaries were also broadcast on Fox Sports in the US.

Other departments

Football (women's)
In September 2020, Real Kashmir FC launched women's development initiative named She Power Programme, in collaboration with Delhi Public School, for U-14 and U-10 girls teams. Senior team was announced in August 2021.

Futsal
The futsal section of Real Kashmir has participated in the inaugural edition of Futsal Club Championship, in which they failed to reach the knock-out stages.

The team previously clinched the state Futsal Championship title for the 1st time in September 2021, defeating Downtown Heroes by 3–1, which was organized by Jammu & Kashmir Football Association.

Football (youth men's)
The U17 men's team of Real Kashmir took part in the group stages of 2022–23 U-17 Youth Cup.

Honours

League
 I-League
Third place (1): 2018–19
 I-League 2nd Division
Champions (1): 2017–18

Cup

 IFA ShieldWinners (2): 2020, 2021
 J&K Invitational Cup'''
Winners (1): 2018

See also
List of football clubs in India
Sports in Jammu and Kashmir

Notes

References

External links
Team info at Global Sports Archive
 Team profile at Soccerway

Real Kashmir FC at the-aiff.com

 
Football clubs in Jammu and Kashmir
Sport in Srinagar
I-League clubs
I-League 2nd Division clubs
Association football clubs established in 2016
2016 establishments in Jammu and Kashmir